2-Pentyne, an organic compound, is an internal alkyne.  It is an isomer of 1-pentyne, a terminal alkyne.

Synthesis
2-Pentyne can be synthesized by the rearrangement 1-pentyne in a solution of ethanolic potassium hydroxide or NaNH2/NH3.

References

External links
 NIST Chemistry WebBook page for 2-pentyne

Alkynes